The 2013–14 Kansas Jayhawks men's basketball team represented the University of Kansas in the 2013–14 NCAA Division I men's basketball season, which was the Jayhawks' 116th basketball season. The Jayhawks played their home games at Allen Fieldhouse as a member of the Big 12 Conference. They finished the season 25–10, 14–4 in Big 12 play to win the Big 12 regular season championship. They advanced to the semifinals of the Big 12 tournament where they lost to Iowa State. They received an at-large bid to the NCAA tournament where they defeated Eastern Kentucky in the round of 64 before losing in the round of 32 to Stanford.

On February 24, 2014, the Jayhawks made history in the "modern era of basketball" by clinching their 10th consecutive Big 12 regular season championship. Only UCLA has won more consecutive "power conference" championships with 13 (1967–1979). Head Coach Bill Self also made history by passing John Wooden and Adolph Rupp (nine consecutive regular season conference championships) for the most consecutive conference championships all-time.

Pre-season

Departures

Transfers

Coaching changes

Recruiting

Class of 2013

|-
| colspan="7" style="padding-left:10px;" | Overall recruiting rankings:      Scout: 2     Rivals: 2       ESPN: 2 
|}

Transfers 

|-
|}

Roster

Schedule

|-
!colspan=12 style="background:#00009C; color:red;"| Exhibition

|-
!colspan=12 style="background:#00009C; color:red;"| Non-conference regular season

|-
!colspan=12 style="background:#00009C; color:red;"| Big 12 regular season

|-
!colspan=12 style="background:#00009C; color:red;"| Big 12 Tournament

|-
!colspan=12 style="background:#00009C; color:red;"| NCAA Tournament

Rankings

*AP does not release post-tournament rankings

References

Kansas Jayhawks men's basketball seasons
Kansas
Kansas
Jay
Jay